Krisztián Szollár (born 30 August 1980) is a Hungarian former professional footballer who played as a defender.

Career
Szollár spent three seasons in the Bundesliga with FC Schalke 04.

Personal life
He also holds German citizenship.

References

Living people
1980 births
Association football midfielders
Hungarian footballers
FC Schalke 04 players
Rot-Weiss Essen players
SG Wattenscheid 09 players
SV Darmstadt 98 players
SC Preußen Münster players
FC Schalke 04 II players
Vác FC players
Viktoria Aschaffenburg players
Bundesliga players
Hungarian expatriate sportspeople in Germany
People from Orosháza
Sportspeople from Békés County